Celebrity Justice is an American news show/nontraditional court show which ran from 2002 to 2005. It was produced by Harvey Levin Productions, and directed by Brad Kreisburg. It was hosted by Holly Herbert and Carlos Diaz.

Despite its short and unremarkable run, Celebrity Justice has since become known as birthing and forming the  format of Levin's later celebrity gossip project, the website TMZ (which was started as a co-collaboration between AOL and Celebrity Justice production company Telepictures and is now owned by the Fox Corporation), and the later program TMZ on TV, which has itself spun off two programs; TMZ Live and TMZ Sports.

Production

Company – Harvey Levin Productions
Directors – Brad Kreisburg, Rob Dorn
Writers – Carlos Diaz, Tony Federico, Holly Herbert, Evan Rosenblum, Danny Tobias
Legal Commentator – Vicki Roberts

Awards and nominations
 Genesis Award, 2005, TV News Magazine Syndicated (WON)

Suggested further reading
 James L. Hirsen, Hollywood Nation: Left Coast Lies, Old Media Spin, and the New Media Revolution (2005), Crown Forum; 
 Irving Rein, Philip Kotler, Michael Hamlin, Martin Stoller, High Visibility: Transforming Your Personal and Professional Brand (2005), McGraw-Hill Professional;

References

External links
 Celebrity Justice, tv.com; accessed November 26, 2014

Television series by Warner Bros. Television Studios
2002 American television series debuts
2005 American television series endings
2000s American television news shows
First-run syndicated television programs in the United States
English-language television shows
Television series by Telepictures